Yukon—Mackenzie River was a federal electoral district in Canada that was represented in the House of Commons of Canada from 1949 to 1953. It covered the Yukon Territory, and the southwestern part of the Northwest Territories. This riding was created in 1947, and was only used in the 1949 federal election. The Northwest Territories had not been represented in the House of Commons since 1905 following the creation of Alberta and Saskatchewan two years earlier. Yukon had been represented continuously since a byelection in January 1903.

It was abolished in 1952 when it was redistributed into Mackenzie River and Yukon ridings.

It consisted of the Yukon Territory and the part of the District of Mackenzie in the Northwest Territories lying west of the 109th meridian west longitude. The remainder of the District of Mackenzie, as well as the Districts of Keewatin, Franklin and Ungava, had no representation until 1962.

Members of Parliament

Election results

See also 

 List of Canadian federal electoral districts
 Past Canadian electoral districts
 Yukon (electoral district)
 Mackenzie River (electoral district)
 Northwest Territories (electoral district)

External links 

Former federal electoral districts of Yukon
Former federal electoral districts of Northwest Territories